Udo the Red Panda is the costumed mascot of the University of Mannheim's athletics teams. He represents an anthropomorphic version of a red panda (or red cat-bear).

History 
The Udo the Red Panda mascot officially debuted at the 2011 WHU Euromasters, when Mannheim beat LMU during the championships. Since then, the mascot has been a fan favorite for Mannheim's athletics fans. As the Mannheim athletics teams do not have a logo on their helmets or uniforms, Udo's likeness appears on much team merchandise and such.

Description and Rationale 
The red panda (Latin: Ailurus fulgens), also known as lesser panda or red cat-bear, is a small arboreal mammal native to the eastern Himalayas and southwestern China that has been classified as Vulnerable by IUCN as its wild population is estimated at less than 10,000 mature individuals. The population continues to decline and is threatened by habitat loss and fragmentation, poaching, and inbreeding depression, although red pandas are protected by national laws in their range countries. The Mannheim sports teams have elected the red panda for their favorite athletics mascot to make the problem of the declining population of this mammal more visible; in addition, the red panda is one of the visitor magnets at the Heidelberg Zoo which is the next larger zoo to Mannheim.

See also 
 University of Mannheim
 WHU

External links 
 Official Teaser of WHU Euromasters 2012
 WHU Euromasters on Twitter

Notes and references 

Bear mascots
Sports mascots
University of Mannheim
Fictional pandas
Mascots introduced in 2011
German mascots
Fictional characters from Baden-Württemberg